Kola is one of the Aru languages, spoken by inhabitants of the Aru Islands.

The Kola language is mostly used on the Kola island, on the north end of the Aru Islands, but is also spoken by Kola people living in Dobo and other parts of Maluku.

References

Aru languages
Languages of Indonesia